The New Zealand Motocross Championship  is the premier domestic Motocross series in New Zealand, sanctioned by Motorcycling New Zealand.

The series runs annually throughout late winter and spring each year. The premier classes are MX1 and MX2 but there are also classes for younger riders, masters and women.

Prior to 1973, the series was known as the New Zealand Scrambles Championship.

History 
Motocross races first occurred in New Zealand during the 1940s and were known as Scrambles. These races were first collected into a championship in 1951, under the moniker of the New Zealand Scrambles Championship. This existed until 1973, when the series was renamed the New Zealand Motocross Championship. Several riders who have had considerable international success have raced in and won the championship on a number of occasions, including Shayne King, Darryl King, Josh Coppins and Ben Townley. The classes within the championship have evolved over time in line with what has been seen in the sport around the world.

Event Format 
Rounds of the New Zealand Motocross Championship typically have a one-day format. Each class has both a short free practice session and a longer qualifying practice session, followed by three main points paying races that contribute to the final overall standings per round.

Points are awarded to finishers of the main races, in the following format:

List of Champions

References

Motorcycle off-road racing series
National championships in New Zealand
Motorcycle racing in New Zealand
Motocross